is a Japanese manga series written and illustrated by Naoki Urasawa. It has been serialized in Shogakukan's Weekly Big Comic Spirits since October 2018, with its chapters published in seven tankōbon volumes as of November 2022. It has been licensed for English release in North America by Viz Media. 

Asadora! tells the story of Asa Asada's life, starting in post-war Japan, and spanning into the then-present year 2020, when a large monster rampages through Tokyo. The story begins in 1959 when Asa looks for a doctor for her mother in labor, only for her to run into a burglar and held for ransom. When Typhoon Vera hits Japan, Asa and her kidnapper must work together to survive.

In 2021, Asadora! won the Lucca Comics Award for Best Manga Series.

Plot
In 1959, just moments before Typhoon Vera makes landfall at the Port of Nagoya, 12-year-old Asa Asada frantically seeks help from a local obstetrician to help deliver her mother's twelfth child.  When she witnesses Kasuga attempting a burglary during the storm, Asa is mistaken as a member of the doctor's family and is taken hostage. When Kasuga realizes his mistake, he regrets his actions, blaming his hard luck after returning from World War II as bomber pilot. He protects Asa from the storm's damage, and the pair work together to distribute food to flood victims by flying a stolen airplane.

As they search the area for Asa's home, they see a large monster's footprint in the debris. Kasuga and Asa locate two of her siblings stranded on a rooftop with the obstetrician, who is holding a newborn child. Asa saves them from the monster, but discovers that Kasuga is wounded. He guides Asa as she flies the plane back to land, and Asa confesses her wish to keep the airplane. Asa attempts to blackmail the plane's owner, who is secretly using the aircraft to smuggle drugs, and he signs over the plane to her before going into police custody.

Five years later, Asa is 17 years old and operating an aircraft company with Kasuga. Kasuga is visited by Colonel Shissoji, a former military commander, who shows him a recent photo of the same monster they encountered years earlier. Attempting to research the monster on her own, Asa meets young scholar Keiichi Nakaido at the National Museum of Nature and Science, who has photo evidence of the monster among the disorganized research left by his mentor, Shinnosuke Yodogawa. Colonel Shissoji gives Asa and Kasuga a secret mission to protect the opening ceremonies of the 1964 Olympic Games by converting their aircraft into a makeshift fighter plane. Meanwhile, Asa is pressured by her school friend Yoneko to accompany her to Tokyo for a singing audition, keeping it secret from their close friend Miyako. Restaurant owner Kinuyo, now acting as the remaining Asada children's adoptive mother, defends them against local bullies when the youngest child, Koshichi, claims to remember seeing the monster even though he was less than a day old during the typhoon. 

Meanwhile, the monster emerges in Sagami Bay, one day before the start of the Olympics. Colonel Shissoji collects Asa from school to bring her to the airfield in preparation to face the monster. Kasuga is unreachable after chasing a newspaper photographer away from the airfield, which results in an accident. Asa decides to fly the mission herself, but Nakaido insists on accompanying her so he can study the monster up close. Yoneko skips school to meet a talent agent but is secretly followed by Miyako.

When Asa and Nakaido confront the monster, they evade its attacks and launch the aircraft's makeshift rockets, but the monster is unharmed. Asa decides to drop bags of fuel on it, lighting the gasoline on fire with her signal flare. The monster is wounded and chases after Asa, who leads it back out into the ocean away from coast. When Asa's plane goes too far out to sea, Kasuga appears in a second aircraft to guide her back to land. Yoneko's audition puts her in an uncomfortable situation, but Nakaido's uncle Eisaku arrives at Asa's request to chaperone her. The agent and Eisaku team together to change Yoneko's image to resemble to Marilyn Monroe, but she rejects their efforts and returns home. Miyako is rescued from street thugs by Ginko and Susie, two female wrestlers.

Following the opening ceremonies, Colonel Shissoji enlists Asa and Kasuga to stay on call in case of another monster attack. Shotaro's family pushes him to simulate the marathon competition during the actual event. Young SDF Lieutenant Kosugi suspects the government is covering up a kaiju attack and fakes an emergency on his naval cruiser to take a closer look.

Characters
Asa Asada
12-year-old (later, 17-year-old) student in Nagoya, the next-to-youngest of 12 children. She becomes a professional pilot.
Kasuga
A World War II veteran pilot who turns to burglary and kidnapping; later aids Asa in her flight training.
Kinuyo
A local restaurant owner who cares for Asa and her remaining siblings after Typhoon Vera.
Shotaro Hayata
A friend of Asa; a young man who dreams of racing in the 1964 Tokyo Olympics.
Keiichi Nakaido
An out-of work biological researcher who searches for evidence of a monster in the notes of his mentor, Shinnosuke Yodogawa.
Eisaku Noro
Keiichi's uncle, owner of a run-down Tokyo cabaret.
Colonel Shissoji
A former military commander and associate of Kasuga. He recruits Kasuga and Asa to track a mysterious monster.
Yoneko and Miyako
Asa's school friends who dream of becoming pop singers.
Shinroku, Hazuki, and Koshichi Asada
The surviving children of the Asada family following Typhoon Vera.
A-kura, B-to, and C-na
Special agents under the command of Colonel Shissoji.
Ginko Kondou and Susie Kaneiri
Female wrestlers who befriend Miyako.
Lieutenant Kosugi
A SDF Naval Lieutenant who searches for information about the monster.

Background
Naoki Urasawa had the initial idea for Asadora! after the 2011 Tōhoku earthquake and tsunami. Wanting a hero that would give readers hope, the author said the main character naturally became a woman because when he draws males the story tends to get dark and depressing. Wanting this character to confront a "certain crisis" at the 1964 Summer Olympics via airplane, she had to be 17-years-old at that point to get a pilot's license. Additionally, while researching Urasawa stumbled upon the 1959 Isewan Typhoon, during which time the girl would be 12, and decided it would be "nice" to begin the story with a 12-year-old girl. This also made Nagoya the setting for the manga. Yuki Takanami, editor of the French version of the series for Kana, stated that its title is a reference to NHK's Renzoku Terebi Shōsetsu television dramas, which are colloquially known as "asadora" and often follow the life of a female protagonist from childhood to adulthood.

The sense of fulfillment Urasawa felt after doing all the backgrounds, inking, erasing, and screentones on the short story "It's a Beautiful Day" led to him doing a lot of the background work on Asadora! by himself, in addition to the main character illustration.

Publication
Asadora!, written and illustrated by Naoki Urasawa, started in Shogakukan's seinen manga magazine Weekly Big Comic Spirits on October 6, 2018. Asadora! is Urasawa's first work published digitally and his first work in the magazine since 21st Century Boys, serialized in 2007. The series' first arc finished in January 2019, and it went on hiatus until May of the same year. The series went on hiatus again in August 2019 and resumed publication in October of the same year. Shōgakukan has compiled its chapters into individual tankōbon volumes. The first volume was published on March 29, 2019. As of November 30, 2022, seven volumes have been published.

In North America, Viz Media announced the English release of the manga in July 2020. The first volume was published on January 19, 2021. The manga has also been licensed in France by Kana and in Italy by Panini Comics.

Volume list

Reception
Asadora! won Best Series at the 2021 Lucca Comics Awards in Italy. It was also nominated for 2021's Young Adults Best Comic Award at the 48th Angoulême International Comics Festival in France and for Best Manga at the Harvey Awards in the United States. Due to depicting the Isewan Typhoon, Asadora! was used as part of an exhibit at the Nagoya City Minato Disaster Prevention Center.

After reading the first volume, South Korean film director Bong Joon-ho wrote that "Asa's wise expression and dignified demeanor already gives me hope and strong expectations", and called Urasawa "the greatest storyteller of our time". He likened the experience of reading Asadora! to that of being able to go back and read 20th Century Boys for the first time again. Rebecca Silverman of Anime News Network gave the first volume an A− grade. She wrote: "This is a very solid work. Asa is the kind of spitfire heroine that's easy to get behind." Reuben Baron of Comic Book Resources said, "As a piece of historical fiction, Asadora! is so convincing that it's almost a surprise once the science fiction elements pop up again in the last two pages of the book."

References

Further reading

External links
 

Fiction set in 1959
Fiction set in 1964
Mystery anime and manga
Nagoya in fiction
Naoki Urasawa
Science fiction anime and manga
Seinen manga
Shogakukan manga
Viz Media manga